Asma Tubi (1905–1983) was a Palestinian writer.

Biography
She was born into a Palestinian Christian family in Nazareth and was educated at the English school there. She studied Greek and then the Quran, to improve her writing skills in Arabic. Tubi moved to Acre after being married. She was a founding member of the Women's Union there. She was also a member of the YWCA and the Young Orthodox Women's Association and served as president of the Arab Women's Union. Tubi appeared on local radio stations, including Huna al-Quds ("Jerusalem here") and Sharq Al-Adna ("Near East") in Jaffa. She also appeared on a radio show in Beirut in 1948. She was editor of the women's page for the newspaper Falastin and for the magazines Al Ahad and Kull shay''' magazine.

She published poetry, plays and fiction, including a number of works in English. When she was forced to leave Palestine in 1948, she left behind a book manuscript called The Arab Palestinian Woman. In 1955, she published a collection of stories titled: Aḥādīth min al-qalb'' (“Stories from the heart"). Also, Tubi began writing plays in 1925. Tubi was considered one of few the Palestinian women writing before 1948, but it was not until after 1948 that Palestinian women's fiction was consolidated artistically.

Tubi died in Beirut in 1983.

Awards
She was awarded the Lebanese Constantine the Great Award in 1973 and the Jerusalem Medal for Culture and Arts (posthumously) in 1990.

References 

1905 births
1983 deaths
Palestinian women writers
Palestinian journalists
Palestinian women poets
Palestinian human rights activists
People from Nazareth
Women's page journalists
20th-century journalists